The Act anent Peace and War (Scots anent means about or concerning) was an act of the Parliament of Scotland passed in 1703.

The Act concerned foreign policy and the royal prerogative: it provided that following the death of Queen Anne without direct heirs, no future monarch of Scotland and England could take Scotland to war without the explicit consent of the parliament.

It was a response to the English Act of Settlement which had made members of the House of Hanover heirs to the throne of England.  The Scots, already unhappy with the War of the Spanish Succession, were concerned that rule by Hanoverians would lead to unwelcome Scottish involvement in German and continental wars. Later the same parliament forced royal assent to the Act of Security. The English parliament retaliated with the Alien Act, removing Scottish trading privileges in England.

The conflict between the two parliaments was finally resolved by their merger under the terms of the Acts of Union 1707. The union made the Act anent Peace and War and the Act of Security void, and they were formally repealed in December 1707.

References

Acts of the Parliament of Scotland
1703 in law
1703 in Scotland
Foreign relations of Scotland
England–Scotland relations
Political history of Scotland
Scottish monarchy
Royal prerogative
Military history of Scotland